Madliena Parish is an administrative unit of Ogre Municipality in the Vidzeme region of Latvia.

Towns, villages and settlements of Madliena Parish 
  – parish administrative center
 Plātere
 Silamuiža
 Vecķeipene
 Zādzene

References

External links

Parishes of Latvia
Ogre Municipality
Vidzeme